In probability theory, a probability density function (PDF), or density of a continuous random variable, is a function whose value at any given sample (or point) in the sample space (the set of possible values taken by the random variable) can be interpreted as providing a relative likelihood that the value of the random variable would be equal to that sample. Probability density  is the  probability per unit length,  in other words, while the absolute likelihood for a continuous random variable to take on any particular value is 0 (since there is an infinite set of possible values to begin with), the value of the PDF at two different samples can be used to infer, in any particular draw of the random variable, how much more likely it is that the random variable would be close to one sample compared to the other sample.

In a more precise sense, the PDF is used to specify the probability of the random variable falling within a particular range of values, as opposed to taking on any one value. This probability is given by the integral of this variable's PDF over that range—that is, it is given by the area under the density function but above the horizontal axis and between the lowest and greatest values of the range. The probability density function is nonnegative everywhere, and the area under the entire curve is equal to 1.

The terms probability distribution function and probability function have also sometimes been used to denote the probability density function. However, this use is not standard among probabilists and statisticians. In other sources, "probability distribution function" may be used when the probability distribution is defined as a function over general sets of values or it may refer to the cumulative distribution function, or it may be a probability mass function (PMF) rather than the density. "Density function" itself is also used for the probability mass function, leading to further confusion. In general though, the PMF is used in the context of discrete random variables (random variables that take values on a countable set), while the PDF is used in the context of continuous random variables.

Example
Suppose bacteria of a certain species typically live 4 to 6 hours. The probability that a bacterium lives  5 hours is equal to zero. A lot of bacteria live for approximately 5 hours, but there is no chance that any given bacterium dies at exactly 5.00... hours. However, the probability that the bacterium dies between 5 hours and 5.01 hours is quantifiable. Suppose the answer is 0.02 (i.e., 2%). Then, the probability that the bacterium dies between 5 hours and 5.001 hours should be about 0.002, since this time interval is one-tenth as long as the previous. The probability that the bacterium dies between 5 hours and 5.0001 hours should be about 0.0002, and so on.

In this example, the ratio (probability of dying during an interval) / (duration of the interval) is approximately constant, and equal to 2 per hour (or 2 hour−1). For example, there is 0.02 probability of dying in the 0.01-hour interval between 5 and 5.01 hours, and (0.02 probability / 0.01 hours) = 2 hour−1. This quantity 2 hour−1 is called the probability density for dying at around 5 hours. Therefore, the probability that the bacterium dies at 5 hours can be written as (2 hour−1) dt. This is the probability that the bacterium dies within an infinitesimal window of time around 5 hours, where dt is the duration of this window. For example, the probability that it lives longer than 5 hours, but shorter than (5 hours + 1 nanosecond), is (2 hour−1)×(1 nanosecond) ≈  (using the unit conversion  nanoseconds = 1 hour).

There is a probability density function f with f(5 hours) = 2 hour−1. The integral of f over any window of time (not only infinitesimal windows but also large windows) is the probability that the bacterium dies in that window.

Absolutely continuous univariate distributions
A probability density function is most commonly associated with absolutely continuous univariate distributions. A random variable  has density , where  is a non-negative Lebesgue-integrable function, if:

and (if  is continuous at )

Formal definition
(This definition may be extended to any probability distribution using the measure-theoretic definition of probability.)

That is, f is any measurable function with the property that:

for any measurable set

Discussion
In the continuous univariate case above, the reference measure is the Lebesgue measure. The probability mass function of a discrete random variable is the density with respect to the counting measure over the sample space (usually the set of integers, or some subset thereof).

It is not possible to define a density with reference to an arbitrary measure (e.g. one can't choose the counting measure as a reference for a continuous random variable). Furthermore, when it does exist, the density is almost unique, meaning that any two such densities coincide almost everywhere.

Further details
Unlike a probability, a probability density function can take on values greater than one; for example, the uniform distribution on the interval [0, 1/2] has probability density f(x) = 2 for 0 ≤ x ≤ 1/2 and f(x) = 0 elsewhere.
The standard normal distribution has probability density

Not every probability distribution has a density function: the distributions of discrete random variables do not; nor does the Cantor distribution, even though it has no discrete component, i.e., does not assign positive probability to any individual point.

A distribution has a density function if and only if its cumulative distribution function  is absolutely continuous. In this case:  is almost everywhere differentiable, and its derivative can be used as probability density:

If a probability distribution admits a density, then the probability of every one-point set  is zero; the same holds for finite and countable sets.

Two probability densities  and  represent the same probability distribution precisely if they differ only on a set of Lebesgue measure zero.

In the field of statistical physics, a non-formal reformulation of the relation above between the derivative of the cumulative distribution function and the probability density function is generally used as the definition of the probability density function. This alternate definition is the following:

Link between discrete and continuous distributions

It is possible to represent certain discrete random variables as well as random variables involving both a continuous and a discrete part with a generalized probability density function using the Dirac delta function. (This is not possible with a probability density function in the sense defined above, it may be done with a distribution.) For example, consider a binary discrete random variable having the Rademacher distribution—that is, taking −1 or 1 for values, with probability  each. The density of probability associated with this variable is:

More generally, if a discrete variable can take  different values among real numbers, then the associated probability density function is:

This substantially unifies the treatment of discrete and continuous probability distributions. The above expression allows for determining statistical characteristics of such a discrete variable (such as the mean, variance, and kurtosis), starting from the formulas given for a continuous distribution of the probability.

Families of densities 
It is common for probability density functions (and probability mass functions) to be parametrized—that is, to be characterized by unspecified parameters.

Different values of the parameters describe different distributions of different random variables on the same sample space (the same set of all possible values of the variable); this sample space is the domain of the family of random variables that this family of distributions describes.  A given set of parameters describes a single distribution within the family sharing the functional form of the density. From the perspective of a given distribution, the parameters are constants, and terms in a density function that contain only parameters, but not variables, are part of the normalization factor of a distribution (the multiplicative factor that ensures that the area under the density—the probability of something in the domain occurring— equals 1). This normalization factor is outside the kernel of the distribution.

Since the parameters are constants, reparametrizing a density in terms of different parameters to give a characterization of a different random variable in the family, means simply substituting the new parameter values into the formula in place of the old ones.

Densities associated with multiple variables 

For continuous random variables , it is also possible to define a probability density function associated to the set as a whole, often called joint probability density function. This density function is defined as a function of the  variables, such that, for any domain  in the -dimensional space of the values of the variables , the probability that a realisation of the set variables falls inside the domain  is

If  is the cumulative distribution function of the vector , then the joint probability density function can be computed as a partial derivative

Marginal densities
For , let  be the probability density function associated with variable  alone.  This is called the marginal density function, and can be deduced from the probability density associated with the random variables  by integrating over all values of the other  variables:

Independence

Continuous random variables  admitting a joint density are all independent from each other if and only if

Corollary

If the joint probability density function of a vector of  random variables can be factored into a product of  functions of one variable

(where each  is not necessarily a density) then the  variables in the set are all independent from each other, and the marginal probability density function of each of them is given by

Example

This elementary example illustrates the above definition of multidimensional probability density functions in the simple case of a function of a set of two variables.

Function of random variables and change of variables in the probability density function

This is also called a “change of variable” and is in practice used to generate a random variable of arbitrary shape  using a known (for instance, uniform) random number generator.

It is tempting to think that in order to find the expected value , one must first find the probability density  of the new random variable .  However, rather than computing

one may find instead

The values of the two integrals are the same in all cases in which both  and  actually have probability density functions.  It is not necessary that  be a one-to-one function.  In some cases the latter integral is computed much more easily than the former. See Law of the unconscious statistician.

Scalar to scalar

Let  be a monotonic function, then the resulting density function is

Here  denotes the inverse function.

This follows from the fact that the probability contained in a differential area must be invariant under change of variables. That is,

or

Vector to vector

Suppose  is an -dimensional random variable with joint density . If , where  is a bijective, differentiable function, then  has density :

The joint distribution for y = (y1, y2) has density

Vector to scalar

This result leads to the law of the unconscious statistician:

Proof:

Let  be a collapsed random variable with probability density function  (i.e., a constant equal to zero). Let the random vector  and the transform  be defined as

which is an upper triangular matrix with ones on the main diagonal, therefore its determinant is 1. Applying the change of variable theorem from the previous section we obtain that

which if marginalized over  leads to the desired probability density function.

Sums of independent random variables

It is possible to generalize the previous relation to a sum of N independent random variables, with densities :

Products and quotients of independent random variables

Given two independent random variables U and V, each of which has a probability density function, the density of the product  and quotient  can be computed by a change of variables.

Example: Quotient distribution

Then, the joint density  can be computed by a change of variables from U,V to Y,Z, and Y can be derived by marginalizing out Z from the joint density.

The inverse transformation is

The absolute value of the Jacobian matrix determinant  of this transformation is:

Thus:

And the distribution of Y can be computed by marginalizing out Z:

This method crucially requires that the transformation from U,V to Y,Z be bijective.  The above transformation meets this because Z can be mapped directly back to V, and for a given V the quotient  is monotonic.  This is similarly the case for the sum , difference  and product .

Exactly the same method can be used to compute the distribution of other functions of multiple independent random variables.

Example: Quotient of two standard normals
Given two standard normal variables U and V, the quotient can be computed as follows.  First, the variables have the following density functions:

We transform as described above:

This leads to:

This is the density of a standard Cauchy distribution.

See also
 Density estimation
 Kernel density estimation
 Likelihood function
 List of probability distributions
 Probability amplitude
 Probability mass function
 Secondary measure
 Uses as position probability density:
 Atomic orbital
 Home range

References

Further reading
 
 
  Chapters 7 to 9 are about continuous variables.

External links
 
 

Functions related to probability distributions
Equations of physics